Shooting at the 1968 Summer Olympics in Mexico City comprised seven events. A second shotgun event, Skeet, was introduced. They were held between 18 and 23 October 1968. For the first time, women competed alongside men.

Medal summary

Participating nations
A total of 351 shooters, 348 men and 3 women, from 62 nations competed at the Mexico City Games:

Medal count

References

External links
Official Olympic Report

 
1968 Summer Olympics events
1968
Olympics
Shooting competitions in Mexico